Joseph French may refer to:
Joseph Nathaniel French (1888–1975), architect
Joseph Lewis French (1858–1936), American novelist, editor, and poet
Joseph French (jockey), steeplechase rider who took part in the 1845 Grand National
Joe French (born 1949), British Air Chief Marshal, Royal Air Force commander
Joe French (footballer), English footballer
Inspector French, a fictional detective created by Freeman Wills Crofts

See also
Joseph French Johnson (1853–1925), economist